Min is an uncommon Korean family name as well as a common syllable in Korean given names.

As a family name
The Korean family name Min is written with only one hanja. The 2000 census found 142,752 people in 43,887 households belonging to this clan (about 0.35% of the South Korean population at the time), making it the 47th-most-common surname among the 286 surnames listed in the census. This represented a growth of 3.8 percent from 137,317 in the 1985 census, a far smaller increase than the fifteen percent growth in the overall South Korean population over the same period. 

The family name Min has one major clan lineage, the Yeoheung Min clan, whose bon-gwan (origin of the lineage, not necessarily the residence of living members) is present-day Yeoju, Gyeonggi Province. Yeoju has traditionally been called Yeoheung (during Joseon dynasty) and Hwangryeo (Goryeo dynasty), and the Min family has accordingly been referred to as Hwangryeo Mins or other variations during different times in history.  

The Yeoheung Min clan is subdivided into 46 sub-clans ("Pa"). In addition to the Yeoheung Mins, the Korean census lists families using the syllable Min in their family names including the Gyeongju Mins and Yeongju Mins. These clans are not listed in the official family tree (Jokbo) of the Yeoheung Min clan and their origins are unverified. 

People with the family name Min include:

Queen Wongyeong (1365–1420), queen consort of King Taejong
Queen Inhyeon (1667–1701), queen consort of King Sukjong of Joseon
Stephen Min Kuk-ka (1787–1840), Korean Roman Catholic saint
Empress Myeongseong (1851–1895), queen consort of King Gojong of Joseon
Min Young-hwan (1861–1905), Korean Empire official
Empress Sunmyeong (1872–1907), princess consort of Emperor Sunjong of Korea
Min Yeong-chan (1873–1948), Korean Empire official
Min Won-sik (1886–1921), Korean male journalist of the Japanese colonial period
Aleksandr Min (1915–1944), first Korean awarded the title of Hero of the Soviet Union
Min Byung-dae (1918–1983), South Korean male football defender
Min Hyun-sik (born 1946), South Korean male architect
Min Young-sam (born 1954), South Korean sport shooter
Min Byung-doo (born 1958), South Korean male politician
Min Gyeong-seung (born 1962), South Korean male fencer
Min Hae-kyung (born 1962), South Korean female singer
Min Joon-ki (born 1968), South Korean male film director
Min Hae-kyung (born 1962), South Korean female singer
Min Se-hun (born 1963), South Korean male discus thrower
Janice Min (born 1969), American female writer of Korean descent
Min Hye-sook (born 1970), South Korean female team handball player
Min Kyu-dong (born 1970), South Korean male film director
Min Kyung-gab (born 1970), South Korean male wrestler
Min Byeong-sun (born 1974), South Korean male rower
Klara Min (born 1976), South Korean female pianist
Min Young-ki (born 1976), South Korean male football defender
Min Hee-jin (born 1979), South Korean female creative director
Min Ryoung (born 1982), South Korean male short track speed skater
Min Kyung-hoon (born 1984), South Korean male singer
Min Ji-hyun (born 1984), South Korean actress
Min Young-won (born Jo Hyo-kyung, 1984), South Korean actress
Min Jin-woong (born 1986), South Korean actor
Zizo (born Min Ju-hong, 1986), South Korean male rapper
Min Hyo-rin (born Jung Eun-ran, 1986), South Korean actress
Jenna Ushkowitz (born Min Ji, 1986), Korean-American actress
Min Byung-hun (born 1987), South Korean male baseball outfielder
Min Sun-ye (born 1989), South Korean female singer, former member of Wonder Girls
Min Na-on (born 1988), South Korean female golfer
Min Ok-ju (born 1990), North Korean female volleyball player
Justin H. Min (born 1990), American actor 
Min Sang-gi (born 1991), South Korean male football midfielder
 Suga (born Min Yoon-gi, 1993), South Korean rapper, member of BTS
Min Do-hee (born 1994), South Korean actress
Grace Min (born 1994), American female tennis player of Korean descent
Yura Min (born 1995), South Korean female ice dancer
Min Kyeong-ho (born 1996), South Korean male track cyclist
Anna Min, 21st-century American photographer of Korean descent
Min Jong-gi, 21st-century South Korean male politician
Pyong Gap Min, 21st-century American sociologist

In given names

Hanja and meaning
In given names, the meaning of Min differs based on the hanja used to write it. There are 27 hanja with the reading Min, and four variant forms, on the South Korean government's official list of hanja which may be used in given names; they are:

: "the people"
: "agile"
: "pity"
: "beautiful gemstone"
: "heaven"
: "gentle"
: the surname Min
: "jade"
: variant forms
: the name of a mountain
: "to exert"
: variant form
: "intelligence"
: "tough"
: "concerned"
: "trickling water"
: "robustness"
: "strong"
: "to perish"
: "stifling"
: "fishing line"
 (a variant form of )
: "coin string"

: name of a tribe
: "sight"
: "net"
: "jade"
: "jade"

As name element
Many names containing the syllable Min have been popular for newborn children in South Korea in recent decades:

Newborn boys
Min-ho (9th place in 1980)
Min-kyu (8th place in 1990)
Min-soo (5th place in 1990)
Min-jun (1st place in 2008, 2009, and 2011)
Sung-min (8th place in 1970, 2nd place in 1980, 3rd place in 1990)

Newborn girls
Min-ji (4th place in 1990)
Min-seo (2nd place in 2008 and 2009, 3rd place in 2011)
Ji-min (3rd place in 2008, 6th place in 2009 and 2011)

Other given names with this syllable include:

Min-a
Min-chul
Min-hee
Min-hyuk
Min-ju
Min-jung
Min-kyung
Min-ki
Min-seok
Min-sun
Min-woo
Min-young
Chang-min
Cheol-min
Hyung-min
Jung-min
Kang-min
Kwang-min
Kyung-min
Seung-min
Soo-min
Young-min

People
People with the single-syllable given name Min include:
Geum Min (born 1962), South Korean politician
Namkoong Min (born 1978), South Korean film and television actor
Kang Min (born 1982), South Korean professional StarCraft player
Sung Min (swimmer) (born 1982), South Korean swimmer
Park Min (born 1986), South Korean football player

See also
List of Korean family names
List of Korean given names

References

Korean-language surnames